Concordia University Library is the library system at Concordia University in Montreal, Quebec, Canada. Concordia University has three library locations. The R. Howard Webster Library is located in the J.W. McConnell Building on the Sir George Williams Campus and the Georges P. Vanier Library is located on the Loyola Campus. On September 2, 2014, the Library opened the Grey Nuns Reading Room, a silent study space for Concordia students located in the former Chapel of the Invention of the Holy Cross. The Reading Room has seating for 192 students, with an additional 42 chairs in small reading rooms. A Political Science student was the first to enter.

The Concordia University Library houses several special collections including the Azrieli Holocaust Collection and the Irving Layton Collection. Most Special Collections are located in the Vanier Library. The Library also maintains the university's institutional repository, Spectrum.

The Concordia University Library is a member of the Canadian Association of Research Libraries. Concordia University Library also has partnerships with the Canadian Research Knowledge Network and The Data Liberation Initiative.

Since 1990, Concordia University Library has been hosting an annual public holiday auction, held every December, where all proceeds go to over 10 Montreal-based charities. The fundraising event is planned and run wholly by the Library staff, also featuring a potluck lunch.

Branches
There are three branches of the Concordia University Library:

R. Howard Webster Library, 1400 De Maisonneuve Boulevard West, Montreal, QC
Georges P. Vanier Library, 7141 Sherbrooke Street West, Montreal, QC
Grey Nuns Reading Room, 1190 Guy Street, Montreal, QC

References

External links
Concordia University Library

Concordia University
Academic libraries in Canada
Libraries in Montreal